Wolong National Nature Reserve, also officially known as Wolong Special Administrative Region, is a protected area located in Wenchuan County, Sichuan Province, People's Republic of China. 

Established in 1963 with an initial size of about 20,000 hectares, the reserve was further expanded in 1975, covering an area of about 200,000 hectares in the Qionglai Mountains region. There are over 4,000 different species recorded in the reserve. According to China's Third National Giant Panda Survey, Wolong National Nature Reserve houses about 150 wild giant pandas. The reserve is also a home to many other endangered species including: snow leopards, red pandas, golden monkeys, white-lipped deer and many precious plants. Before the devastating 2008 Wenchuan earthquake Wolong received up to 200,000 visitors every year.

As one of the Sichuan Giant Panda Sanctuaries, Wolong National Nature Reserve has been a UNESCO World Heritage Site since 2006.

Background 
In June 1980, the Chinese government started its cooperation with the World Wide Fund for Nature and the "China Conservation and Research Center for the Giant Panda" (CCRCGP) was established to ensure a future for the giant pandas. The aim was to increase the number of pandas in captive-breeding programs, however with the ultimate goal to return a larger number of pandas to their original, natural habitats. When the cooperation started giant pandas were still listed as an endangered species by the IUCN.
In 2016, the IUCN reclassified the giant panda from being "endangered" to the new classification "vulnerable", affirming decade-long efforts to save the panda.

Location 

A mountain stream runs through the Wolong Valley (where the reserve is); the stream is heavily armoured with boulders and smaller rounded stones.  Stream waters are rather alkaline with pH levels in the range of 8.91. (Hogan, 2007)  Water quality turbidity is quite high due to extensive sand and gravel mining in stream.

According to a 2001 research by Jianguo Liu, the rate of destruction is higher after the reserve's creation than before its creation. Using NASA's satellite images and records of population, Liu's research team concluded that due to tourism and the increase in local population, the reserve is facing an unprecedented threat. "Tourists don't think they have an impact on panda habitat, but indirectly each visitor has some impact," Liu said. "We don't see ourselves as a destructive force, but we are."

Global Breeding Program 
Pandas from Wolong have been loaned to zoos all over the world to ensure breeding success. Bai Yun, who was the first female panda born at the Nature Reserve in 1991, was the first panda to be loaned to a zoo outside of China. From 1996 until 2019 she lived at the San Diego Zoo in California, where she gave birth to six cubs. 
When the conservation loan ended, 27 year old Bai Yun was returned to China together with her last-born old son, Xiao Liwu.
The China Conservation and Research Center for the Giant Panda engages in global cooperations with 16 zoos in 14 countries, providing the world's largest platform for the scientific research regarding the giant pandas. By 2019 a total of 19 other pandas have been returned to China.

Fauna 
The giant panda is the most famous species of the reserve. Other typical larger Carnivora are the Ussuri dhole, Asian black bear, Asiatic golden cat, red panda, hog badger and yellow-throated marten. Hooved mammals are represented by Sichuan takins, wild boar, musk deer, mainland serows, Chinese gorals, tufted deer and sambar deer. Other noticeable mammals include golden snub-nosed monkeys, Tibetan macaques, complex-toothed flying squirrels, bamboo rats, and porcupines. Because the reserve comprises different altitudes, it includes tropical and temperate climate zones and harbors species typically for the tropics, like sambar deer as well as species from temperate regions, like white-lipped deer, snow leopards and Turkestan lynxes.
Camera-trap surveys conducted in the reserve area between 2005 and 2009 did not record any leopard. The same camera, installed in 2017, also captured images of snow leopards seven times.

2008 earthquake

The region, including the Panda Research Center, was largely devastated by the catastrophic May 12, 2008 Sichuan earthquake, though the captive giant pandas were initially reported to be safe. Immediately after the quake, officials were unable to contact the reserve. Five security guards at the reserve were killed by the earthquake. Six pandas escaped after their enclosures were damaged. By May 20, two pandas at the reserve were found to be injured, while the search continued for another two adult pandas that went missing after the quake. On May 28, 2008, nine-year-old Mao Mao (mother of five) was still missing, On Monday, June 9, she was found dead as a result of being crushed by a wall in her enclosure.

The giant pandas were relocated to the Bifengxia Panda Base, which is also managed by the China Panda Protection and Research Center. Starting in 2012, they were relocated to the new Shenshuping Panda Center.

Giant Panda National Park 
In 2020, Wolong Natural Nature Reserve became part of the Giant Panda National Park. It was established to improve living and mating conditions for the fragmented populations of pandas by combining 67 small natural reserves. With a size of 10,500 square miles the park is roughly three times as large as Yellowstone National Park. The state-owned Bank of China helped to enable the giant project with 1.5 billions USD.
A major aim is to permanently stabilize the panda population in size and making avoid inbreeding, which is a risk for the vitality and health of small, isolated populations. A low genetic variety makes the individuals less resilient to various health threats and genetic mutation. Allowing a larger group of individuals to roam through a larger area freely enables them to choose from a greater variety of mates and helps to enrich genetic diversity of their offsprings.

See also 
 Bifengxia Panda Base
 Chengdu Research Base of Giant Panda Breeding
 Dengsheng
 Sichuan Giant Panda Sanctuaries
 Wildlife of China

References

External links 

  
Wolong National Nature Reserve  In Bloomberg

Biological research institutes
Nature reserves of Sichuan
Biosphere reserves of China
Protected areas established in 1963
Tourist attractions in Sichuan
1963 establishments in China
Wenchuan County
Zoos in China